The following is a list of columns and towers located in Istanbul, Turkey:

Columns
Aviation Martyrs' Monument (Hava Şehitleri Anıtı)
Column of Constantine (Çemberlitaş)
Monument of Liberty (Hürriyet Anıtı)
Obelisk of Theodosius  (Dikilitaş)
Goths Column (Gotlar Sütunu)
Column of Marcian (Kıztaşı)
Column of Constantine V Porphyrogenetus (Örme Sütun) 
Serpent Column (Yılanlı Sütun)

Towers
 Beyazit Tower
 Çamlıca TRT Television Tower
 Dolmabahçe Clock Tower
 Endem TV Tower
 Etfal Hospital Clock Tower
 Galata Tower
 Kız Kulesi
 Küçük Çamlıca TV Radio Tower 
 Nusretiye Clock Tower
 Yıldız Clock Tower

References
 Istanbul Municipality

Related lists
List of museums and monuments in Istanbul
List of urban centers in Istanbul
List of universities in Istanbul
List of schools in Istanbul
List of architectural structures in Istanbul
List of columns and towers in Istanbul
List of libraries in Istanbul
List of mayors of Istanbul
List of Istanbulites

Istanbul-related lists

Columns
Istanbul